The 1940 Tour de Serbie was the 2nd edition of the Tour de Serbie cycling stage race. It was scheduled from 29 August to 6 September.

The winner of overall classification was Janez Peternel.

Schedule

Final standings

General classification

References

Vreme digital archive (28. August-7. September)
Politika digital archive (28. August-7. September)
Pravda digital archive (28. August-7. September)
Slovenski dom digital archive (28. August-7. September)

External links

Tour de Serbie 1940
Tour de Serbie 1940
Tour de Serbie